Institut national de la statistique may refer to:
 Institut national de la statistique et de l'analyse économique (INSAE), in Benin
 (fr) (INSD), in Burkina Faso
 Institut national de la statistique (INS), or National Institute of Statistics (Cameroon), in Cameroon
 (fr) (INSEED), in Chad
 Institut national de la statistique(fr) (INS), in Côte d'Ivoire
 Institut national de la statistique et des études économiques(fr) (INSEE), in France
 (fr) (INSTAT), in Mali
 (fr) (INSTAT), in Madagascar
 Institut national de la statistique (INS), in Niger
 Institut national de la statistique, or Instituto Nacional de Estadística (Spain) (INE), in Spain
 Institut national de la statistique (INS), in Tunisia

See also 
 List of national and international statistical services
 INS (disambiguation)